Park National Bank may refer to:
Park National Bank (Ohio), a division of Park National Corp.
Park National Bank (FBOP), an FBOP division, based in Chicago, Illinois